Belmont Methodist-Episcopal Church is a historic church building, located in the Belmont neighborhood of Roanoke, Virginia. The building currently (2019) belongs to the Metropolitan Community Church of the Blue Ridge, who acquired the building in 2003 and use it as their sanctuary.

It was built as a Methodist Episcopal church between 1917 and 1921, and is a three-story, brick, late Gothic Revival-style church. It features a tall bell tower, complex roof form, steeply-pitched gables and parapets, large pointed arch windows, crenellated corner towers, buttresses, cast-concrete quatrefoils, and other detailing. Capacity within sight and hearing of the pulpit is 1,000, as the original auditorium (seats 440) was enlarged with an adjoining parlor (75), an adult assembly room (260), and a gallery (225).

In a notice from 1917, H. L. Cain is named the architect of the church building, and the cost of the building was initially budgeted at $50,000.00.

It was added to the National Register of Historic Places in 2011.

References

External links
 Metropolitan Community Church of the Blue Ridge website
 Belmont Methodist-Episcopal Church Facebook

Metropolitan Community Churches
Churches on the National Register of Historic Places in Virginia
Gothic Revival church buildings in Virginia
Methodist churches in Virginia
20th-century Methodist church buildings in the United States
Churches completed in 1921
Churches in Roanoke, Virginia
National Register of Historic Places in Roanoke, Virginia
1921 establishments in Virginia